Kızılay is the short name for Kızılay Derneği, the Turkish Red Crescent.

Places
Cyprus
 Kızılay, Cyprus the Turkish name for the town of Trachonas

Turkey
 Kızılay, Ankara, a neighborhood of Ankara, and one of the primary nerve centers of the city
Kızılay Meydanı, a square in the neighborhood